Victor Hilary Danckwerts (1890–1944) was a Royal Navy officer who served in the First and Second World Wars.

He commanded the light cruiser  at the beginning of the 1930s and then served as one of the Assistant Directors of Plans at the Admiralty in 1932–1934. He commanded the Sixth Destroyer Flotilla in 1936–1938 and then became Director of Plans in 1938–1940. Danckwerts served as the Deputy Commander-in-Chief, Eastern Fleet from 1942 until his death two years later.

Citations

Bibliography
 

1890 births
1944 deaths
Royal Navy admirals of World War II
Royal Navy officers of World War I